MTV Japan (Music Television Japan) is the Japanese version of the cable television network based in Japan. It is a subsidiary of Paramount Networks Japan K.K., and was launched on November 15, 1993. It can be viewed on cable television, SKY PerfecTV!, SKY PerfecTV! e2 and IPTV.

History 
MTV originally was a music block on Asahi Broadcasting Corporation from 1984 to 1988. Then it became a block on Tokyo Broadcasting System from 1989 to 1992.

In 1992, Music Channel, Inc. acquired a license from Viacom to broadcast with the MTV name. Broadcast began on CS Analog and Skyport services, with PerfecTV! accessed added in 1996 and DirecTV access added in 1997. Notable VJs from that time include Marc Panther and Ken Lloyd.

In 1998, Music Channel canceled their license with Viacom because of the high license fee required. Consequently, from 1999 the station changed its name to Vibe and shifted its content focus from Western music to domestic music products. Without the MTV brand name behind it, competition from other channels such as Space Shower TV and Sony Music Japan's Viewsic (now Music On! TV) led to the station being acquired by H&Q Asia Pacific in 2000.

Also in 2000, MTV Broadcasting Japan, Inc., a separate company formed by groups like CSK and Sega, acquired a broadcast license from SKY PerfecTV!. However, the company never broadcast under the MTV name; it changed its name to M-BROS and broadcast under that name on both DirecTV and SKY PerfecTV! until April 30, 2002.

Following this attempt to use the MTV name (and perhaps because of it), Viacom once again formed a contract with Music Channel, and created a revival of MTV Japan on January 1, 2001, this time under the umbrella of MTV Networks and with the support of MTV capital. Music Channel, Inc. also changed its company name to MTV Japan, Inc. at this time. The first video played on MTV Japan was bird's "Mind Travel."

The Vibe name carries on in its Internet activities, which were spun off from the channel as VIBE, Inc. This company was integrated into Bandai Networks in 2005.

There is a marked difference in this revival of MTV Japan when contrasted to the old MTV Japan. The older MTV Japan focused on overseas artists, whereas the current MTV Japan focuses on domestic artists. As a result, the channel has drawn criticism from proponents of the older MTV Japan. However, in March 2006 the network drew 6,000,000 viewers, making the channel second to Space Shower TV and an overall financial success.

In August 2006, MTV Japan was made a complete subsidiary of MTV Networks and again made a complete subsidiary of Viacom International Media Networks on December 1, 2014. This was to consolidate its activities with other Viacom subsidiaries in Japan, such as Nickelodeon Japan and the FLUX Digital Content Service.

Some of the most popular musical acts such as Ayumi Hamasaki and Tohoshinki have received several awards from this channel and performed numerous times on its awards show.

Programming 
MTV Japan broadcasts varieties of programs, Unlike its American counterpart, MTV Japan tends to broadcast music videos rather than reality television or music-related programs and it also displays shows from the American counterpart or the channel, such as The Hills, Laguna Beach, etc.

Homegrown Shows 
 Brand New Mix
 Classic MTV
 Download Chart Top 20
 International Top 20
 Japan Chart Top 20
 Korea Hits (simulcast from MTV Korea)
 MTV A Class
 MTV×DAM WANNASING KARAOKEE CHART (in cooperation with Daiichikosho Amusement Multimedia (DAM))
 MTV×FM802 Osakan Hit Chart (in cooperation with FM802) 
 MTV×J-WAVE Tokio Hot 100 (in cooperation with J-Wave)
 MTV Check the Rhyme
 MTV Fresh
 MTV Mega Vector
 MTV News
 MTV Student Voice Awards
 MTV Top Hits
 MTV Video Music Awards Japan
 Music Video Selection
 Unplugged (Japanese version)
 U.S. Top 20
 Shibuhara Girls

Shows Imported from MTV Networks Worldwide 
 America's Best Dance Crew
 Behind the Music
 BET Awards
 Blue Mountain State
 Britney Spears Official Top 20 (MTV UK)
 The City
 Disaster Date
 The Dudesons in America
 The Greatest...
 The Hard Times of RJ Berger
 Headbangers Ball
 The Hills
 iCarly
 Jersey Shore
 Making the Video
 MTV Europe Music Awards
 MTV Movie Awards
 MTV Video Music Awards
 MTV World Stage Live in Malaysia
 My Life As Liz
 The Price of Beauty
 Real World/Road Rules Challenge: The Island
 SpongeBob SquarePants
 Taking the Stage
 Valemont
 VH1 Storytellers
 South Park
 Beavis and Butt-Head
 MTV Pinoy on MTV Japan

Past Homegrown Shows 
 U.K. Top 10
 Usavich
 World Chart Express with Honda

VJs 
Current VJs:
 Arisa Urahama
 Boo
 CHRIS

Past VJs:
 MEGUMI
 RENA
 Marc Panther
 Ken Lloyd
 Teppei (now a DJ on ZIP-FM Nagoya)
 Akiko Fukuda
 George Williams
 RURI
 KENNY
 Rei
 Kana Oya
 John Robinson
 Keiko Yamada

External links 
 Official Site (In Japanese)
 Official MySpace Site

MTV channels
Television channels and stations established in 1992
1992 establishments in Japan
Music organizations based in Japan